The Illinois Department on Aging is the code department of the Illinois state government that exercises, administers, and enforces all rights, powers, and duties vested in it by the Illinois Act on the Aging.

As of March 2019 Paula A. Basta became the Director of Aging. The Illinois Council on Aging, with its citizen and legislative members, serves as the advisory body to the Department on Aging.

References

External links 
 Official website

Aging